Mauricio Rotella (born 24 February 1970) is a Chilean alpine skier. He competed at the 1988 Winter Olympics and the 1992 Winter Olympics.

References

1970 births
Living people
Chilean male alpine skiers
Olympic alpine skiers of Chile
Alpine skiers at the 1988 Winter Olympics
Alpine skiers at the 1992 Winter Olympics
Place of birth missing (living people)
20th-century Chilean people